S. Obul Reddy (9 April 1916 - July 1996) was Chief Justice of High Courts of Andhra Pradesh and Gujarat and Governor of Andhra Pradesh.

Early life 
He studied at Board High School, Nandalur, Government Arts College, Anantapur, Presidency College, Madras and Law College, Madras.

Career 
He held various positions as an Advocate, District and Sessions Judge, Grade-II and Grade-I and Registrar, Additional Judge and Permanent Judge in High Court of Andhra Pradesh from 1943 to 1974. 
           
He was appointed Chief Justice of Andhra Pradesh High Court on 1 June 1974 and acted as Governor of Andhra Pradesh from 26 January 1975 to 10 January 1976. He was transferred as chief justice of Gujarat High Court on 7 July 1976 and retransferred as Chief Justice of Andhra Pradesh High Court, on 19 August 1977 and worked until 8 April 1978.

According to M. Jagannadha Rao as stated in his speech, "Justice Obul Reddy was thus intelligent, sharp and quick, was orthodox and not an activist judge, was self disciplined and was a strict disciplinarian whether it was within the judiciary or where the bar involved. It is obvious that he was not bothered much about what the subordinate judiciary or the bar felt about his principles.  He treated seniors and juniors alike.  His judgments were never delayed.  He had no backlog of judgements.  He was God-fearing and believed in destiny."

References

Telugu people
1916 births
Judges of the Andhra Pradesh High Court
Judges of the Gujarat High Court
Chief Justices of the Andhra Pradesh High Court
20th-century Indian judges
Presidency College, Chennai alumni

Assassinated Indian politicians
1996 deaths
Governors of Andhra Pradesh